Chai-Anan Samudavanija (23 February 1944 – 14 September 2018) was a Thai political scientist. He served as director of Vajiravudh College, president of the Royal Institute, judge of the Constitutional Court, and professor of political science at Chulalongkorn University.  He was one of the key drafters of the 1997 Constitution of Thailand.  During the 2005-2006 political crisis, he was a vocal critic of Prime Minister Thaksin Shinawatra. He was associated with Sondhi Limthongkul: he chaired IEC and was head of several of Sondhi's foundations.  Chai-Anan supported the 2006 military coup that overthrew the Thaksin government.

After gaining the support of the military and 40 provincial millionaires, Chai-Anan helped found the Matchima political party.

Chai-Anan died on 14 September 2018 at King Chulalongkorn Memorial Hospital at the age of 74.

Academic rank
 Professor

References

External links
 Short biography at the website of EGCO public company limited
 Bangkok Post, Chai-Anan ready to enter party politics, 30 June 2007
 The Nation, New party ready to launch, 26 June 2007

Chai-Anan Samudavanija
Chai-Anan Samudavanija
Chai-Anan Samudavanija
Chai-Anan Samudavanija
Chai-Anan Samudavanija
Chai-Anan Samudavanija
Chai-Anan Samudavanija
Chai-Anan Samudavanija
Constitutional court judges
2018 deaths
1944 births
Political scientists on Thailand